Linaria ricardoi is a rare Portuguese endemic plant species in the family Plantaginaceae. It blossoms from March to April.

Distribution and habitat
Linaria ricardoi is endemic to southern Portugal in the Alentejo Region but the species' main distribution area is in the Beja District (specifically in Ferreira do Alentejo, Beja, Cuba and Serpa. It lives in wheat and oat fields, fallows and meadows in traditional or mounted olive groves, rarely on embankments and side roads.  It prefers acid soils of loam or clay and calcareous soils.

Threats
It is threatened by agricultural intensification and the related increase in herbicide use. Overgrazing and droughts are other factors that can affect this plant.

References

ricardoi
Endemic flora of Portugal
Endemic flora of the Iberian Peninsula